Bloomfield Township is one of the twelve townships of Jackson County, Ohio, United States.  As of the 2010 census, 1,139 people lived in the township.

Geography
Located in the eastern part of the county, it borders the following townships:
Milton Township: north
Wilkesville Township, Vinton County: northeast corner
Huntington Township, Gallia County: east
Raccoon Township, Gallia County: southeast corner
Madison Township: south
Franklin Township: west
Lick Township: northwest

No municipalities are located in Bloomfield Township.

Name and history
Statewide, other Bloomfield Townships are located in Logan and Trumbull counties.

Government
The township is governed by a three-member board of trustees, who are elected in November of odd-numbered years to a four-year term beginning on the following January 1. Two are elected in the year after the presidential election and one is elected in the year before it. There is also an elected township fiscal officer, who serves a four-year term beginning on April 1 of the year after the election, which is held in November of the year before the presidential election. Vacancies in the fiscal officership or on the board of trustees are filled by the remaining trustees.

References

External links
County website

Townships in Jackson County, Ohio
Townships in Ohio